Yunguyo Province is a province of the Puno Region in Peru. The capital of the province is the city of Yunguyo.

Political division 
The province measures  and is divided into seven districts:

Ethnic groups 
The people in the province are mainly indigenous citizens of Aymara descent. Aymara is the language which the majority of the population (67.84%) learnt to speak in childhood, 31.34% of the residents started speaking using the Spanish language and  0.56 	% using Quechua (2007 Peru Census).

See also 
 Asiru Phat'jata
 Intini Uyu Pata
 Qhapiya
 Tupu Inka

References

External links 
  Official website

Provinces of the Puno Region